Javier Hernández (born 1988), nicknamed "Chicharito", is a Mexican striker.

Javier Hernández may also refer to:

Arts and entertainment
 Javier Hernandez (comics) (born 1966), American comic book creator

Politicians
 Héctor Javier Hernández (born 1958), Mexican politician
 Javier Hernández Manzanares (born 1960), Mexican politician
 Javier Barba-Hernández (died 1986), former lawyer turned enforcer
 Luis Javier Hernández Ortiz, Puerto Rican mayor

Sportspeople

Association football
 Javier Hernández (footballer, born 1961), Mexican football midfielder and father of the Mexican striker
 Javi Hernández (footballer, born 1983), Spanish football centre-back
 Javi Hernández (footballer, born 1989), Spanish football attacking midfielder
 Javi Hernández (footballer, born 1998), Spanish football defender
 Javi Hernández (footballer, born 2000), Spanish football centre-back

Other sports
 Javier Hernández (wrestler) (born 1952), Mexican wrestler
 Jesús Javier Hernández Silva (1971–1993), nicknamed "Oro", Mexican wrestler
 Javier Hernández Aguiran (born 1979), Spanish Paralympic swimmer and sports journalist
 Javier Hernández (sailor) (born 1983), Spanish sailor
 Javier Hernández (kickboxer) (born 1989), Spanish kickboxer
 Javier Hernández Maradiaga (born 1988), Honduran swimmer

See also
 Jay Hernandez (born 1978), American actor
 Xavi Hernández (born 1980), Spanish football manager and former midfielder
 Javi Chino (birth name Francisco Javier Hernández González, born 1987), Spanish footballer
 Xavier Hernandez (baseball) (born 1965), former American baseball player